Ramezani (adjective form of "Ramadan") is a Persian language surname which in its Latin transcription of the Perso-Arabic alphabet is also common among the Iranian diaspora. Notable people with the surname include:

 Alireza Ramezani (born 1984), Iranian footballer
 Alireza Ramezani (born 1993), Iranian football midfielder
 Arman Ramezani (born 1992), Iranian football forward
 Dariush Ramezani (born 1976), Iranian cartoonist
 Mojtaba Ramezani (born 1989), Iranian football midfielder 
 Roya Ramezani, Iranian designer and women's rights campaigner
 Saeed Ramezani (born 1976), Iranian retired football player

References 

Persian-language surnames